Santpur is a town and market center in Chandrapur Municipality in Rautahat District in the Narayani Zone of south-eastern Nepal. The formerly village development committee was merged to form the municipality on 18 May 2014. At the time of the 1991 Nepal census it had a population of 5594.

References

Populated places in Rautahat District